Outstrip (foaled 27 January 2011) is a British Thoroughbred racehorse. He was one of the leading two-year-old in Britain in 2013 when he won the Champagne Stakes and was placed in both the Vintage Stakes and the Dewhurst Stakes. In November he was sent to the United States where he won the Breeders' Cup Juvenile Turf.

Background
Outstrip is a grey colt bred by the Darley Stud. He was sired by the Australian stallion Exceed And Excel, whose other European progeny have included the Queen Elizabeth II Stakes winner Excelebration. Outstrip's dam, Asi Siempre, from whom he inherited his grey colour, was a top class American racemare whose wins included the Spinster Stakes. The colt was sent into training with Mahmood Al Zarooni at Godolphin's British base at Moulton Paddocks, in Newmarket, but the stable was taken over by Charlie Appleby when Zarooni was banned after a doping scandal.

Racing career

2013: two-year-old season
Outstrip was ridden in all his European races by Mickael Barzalona. He made his racecourse debut in a seven furlong maiden race at Newmarket Racecourse on 22 June. He was made the 4/1 third favourite in a field of twelve runners and recovered from a slow start to win by one and a half lengths from True Story. The colt was then moved up sharply in class for the Group Three Vintage Stakes at Goodwood Racecourse on 31 July. He took the lead a furlong from the finish but was overtaken in the final strides and was beaten a neck by the Richard Hannon, Sr.-trained favourite Toormore. Outsrip's next race was the Group Two Champagne Stakes at Doncaster Racecourse on 14 September. He started slowly but accelerated in the last quarter mile to take the lead a furlong from the finish and won by three lengths and a head from The Grey Gatsby and Cable Bay at odds of 13/8. Barzalona described the winner as "a nice horse who will improve for this race. He will be a serious horse next year." After the race bookmakers offered the horse at odds of 20/1 for the following year's 2000 Guineas.

On 12 October, Outstrip contested Britain's most prestigious two-year-old race, the Group One Dewhurst Stakes over seven furlongs at Newmarket. He started the 15/8 second favourite behind the Aidan O'Brien-trained War Command. Barzalona settled the colt behind the leaders but was unable to make significant progress in the closing stages and finished third behind War Command and Cable Bay. On his final appearance of the season, Outstrip was sent to California to contest the Grade I Breeders' Cup Juvenile Turf over one mile at Santa Anita Park. Ridden by the American veteran Mike Smith (Barzalona was committed to ride for Godolphin in Japan) he came from well off the pace to win from Giovanni Boldini and Bobby's Kitten.

In the official ratings published in January 2014, Outstrip was rated the sixth-best European two-year-old of 2013, five pounds behind of the Toormore.

2014: three-year-old season
On his first appearance as a three-year-old, Outstrip started at odds of 25/1 for the 2000 Guineas over the Rowley Mile course at Newmarket on 3 May. He was held up in the early stages and after struggling to obtain a clear run in the final quarter mile he was eased down and finished last of the fourteen runners behind Night of Thunder. After his poor run at Newmarket, Outstrip started a 33/1 outsider for the St James's Palace Stakes at Royal Ascot. Ridden for the first time by William Buick he produced a much better effort to finish third, beaten two and a quarter lengths and a length by Kingman and Night of Thunder, despite his jockey dropping his whip a furlong from the finish. In the Sussex Stakes at Goodwood on 30 July Outstrip started at odds of 20/1 and finished last of the four runners behind Kingman, Toronado and Darwin.

Stud career

Outstrip began his breeding career as a stallion at Darley Stud in England.  In 2021 he was purchased by a group of breeders to stand in Brazil.

Notable progeny

c = colt, f = filly, g = gelding

Pedigree

Outstrip is inbred 4s x 4s x 4d to Northern Dancer. This means that the stallion appears three times in the fourth generation of his pedigree. He is also inbred 4d x 4d to Sir Ivor

References

2011 racehorse births
Racehorses bred in the United Kingdom
Racehorses trained in the United Kingdom
Thoroughbred family 1-l
Breeders' Cup Juvenile Turf winners